The following is a list of episodes for  On the Buses, a British sitcom that aired on ITV from 28 February 1969 to 20 May 1973.

Series overview

Episodes

Series 1 (1969)

Series 2 (1969)

Series 3 (1970)

Series 4 (1970–71)

Series 5 (1971)

Series 6 (1972)

Series 7 (1973)

References

External links
 
 
Official On the Buses Fanclub
Official On the Buses page on Facebook
Official On the Buses account on Twitter

Lists of British sitcom episodes
On the Buses